L'Olleria is a municipality in the comarca of Vall d'Albaida in the Valencian Community, Spain. It is famous by its glass manufacturing activity, especially blown glass. L'Olleria is an important industrial site in the Vall d'Albaida area.

References

External links
 

Municipalities in the Province of Valencia
Vall d'Albaida